A Distant History: Rarities 1997–2007 is a download-only compilation album by the Scottish rock band Idlewild, released on , on Parlophone. The album is a companion piece to Scottish Fiction: Best of 1997–2007 and is composed of rarities and B-sides from throughout the band's career.

According to the band's mailing list, the track listing was chosen by the band themselves.

Track listing 
Source: Amazon

References

External links
Official Idlewild website

Idlewild (band) albums
2007 compilation albums
B-side compilation albums